Back to Love is the fifth studio album by American R&B singer Anthony Hamilton. It was released on December 13, 2011, by RCA Records. The album features writing and production from Babyface, Dre & Vidal, Kelvin Wooten, Mike City, Jairus Mozee, Avila Brothers, as well as Hamilton himself.

It was nominated for the Grammy Award for Best R&B Album in 2013. The album's lead single "Woo", which was released on October 11, 2011. The second single "Pray For Me" was also Grammy nominated in 2013 for Best R&B Song and reached number one on the Billboard Adult R&B Songs chart.

Critical reception

Back to Love has received generally favorable reviews from music critics. At Metacritic, which assigns a normalized rating out of 100 to reviews from mainstream critics, the album received an average score of 82, based on seven reviews, which indicates "universal acclaim." Allmusic editor Andy Kellman found that Back to Love "is clearly viewed as a fresh start, even though it offers no more surprises than Ain't Nobody Worryin' or The Point of It All [...] That Back to Love is not a major shake-up is not a bad thing. Most of the songs are instantly ingratiating in some way, with none of the lighter, upbeat numbers the least bit out of character. There are some sad-cat moments that come very close to the standard Hamilton set."

Commercial performance
The album debuted at number 12 on the US Billboard 200 chart, selling over 63,000 copies in the first week. The album has sold 372,000 copies in the US as of February 2016.

Singles 
The album's lead single "Woo", which was released on October 11, 2011.
The album's second single "Pray for Me" was released on March 27, 2012.
The album's third single "Best of Me" was released on February 4, 2013.

Track listing

Charts

Weekly charts

Year-end charts

References

2011 albums
Anthony Hamilton (musician) albums
RCA Records albums
Albums produced by Salaam Remi
Albums produced by Dre & Vidal